Harold Wallace Ross (November 6, 1892 – December 6, 1951) was an American journalist who co-founded The New Yorker magazine in 1925 with his wife Jane Grant, and was its editor-in-chief until his death.

Early life
Born in a prospector's cabin in Aspen, Colorado, Ross was the son of Scots-Irish immigrant miner George Ross and schoolteacher Ida ( Martin) Ross. When he was eight, the family left Aspen because of the collapse in the price of silver, moving to Redcliff and Silverton, Colorado, then to Salt Lake City, Utah. In Utah, he worked on the high school paper (The West High Red & Black) and was a stringer for The Salt Lake Tribune, the city's leading daily newspaper. He dropped out of school at 13 and ran away to his uncle in Denver, where he worked for The Denver Post. Though he returned to his family, he did not return to school, instead getting a job at the Salt Lake Telegram, a smaller afternoon daily newspaper.

By the time he was 25 he had worked for at least seven different papers, including the Marysville, California Appeal; the Sacramento Union; the Panama Star and Herald; the New Orleans Item; the Atlanta Journal; the Hoboken Hudson Observer; the Brooklyn Eagle; and the San Francisco Call.

In Atlanta, he covered the murder trial of Leo Frank, one of the "trials of the century". During World War I, he enlisted in the U.S. Army Eighteenth Engineers Railway Regiment. In France, he edited the regimental journal and went to Paris to work for the Stars and Stripes, serving from February 1918 to April 1919. He claimed to have walked 150 miles to reach Paris to write for Stars and Stripes, where he met Alexander Woollcott, Cyrus Baldridge, Franklin Pierce Adams, and Jane Grant, who would become his first wife and helped back The New Yorker.

After the war, he returned to New York City and assumed the editorship of a magazine for veterans, The Home Sector. It folded in 1920 and was absorbed by the American Legion Weekly. He spent a few months at Judge, a humor magazine.

The New Yorker
 
Ross envisioned a new journal of metropolitan sensibilities and a sophisticated tone. This led him to co-found The New Yorker with his wife Jane Grant. The first issue was dated February 21, 1925. In partnership with yeast heir Raoul Fleischmann, they established F-R Publishing Company to publish it.

Ross was an original member of the Algonquin Round Table. He used his contacts in "The Vicious Circle" to help get The New Yorker started. Ross, said by Alexander Woollcott to resemble "a dishonest Abe Lincoln", attracted talent to his new publishing venture, ultimately featuring writers such as Woollcott, James Thurber, E. B. White, John McNulty, Joseph Mitchell, Katharine S. White, S. J. Perelman, Janet Flanner, Wolcott Gibbs, St. Clair McKelway, John O'Hara, Robert Benchley, Dorothy Parker, Vladimir Nabokov, Sally Benson, A. J. Liebling, and J. D. Salinger.

The original prospectus for the magazine read, "The New Yorker will be the magazine which is not edited for the old lady in Dubuque." Thurber noted the prospectus does not read or sound like Ross, summarizing Ross's goals so:
[Casuals] was Ross's word for fiction and humorous pieces of all kinds ... [it] indicated Ross's determination to give the magazine an offhand, chatty, informal quality. Nothing was to be labored or studied, arty, literary, or intellectual.
Ross forbade sex as a subject, checking all art and articles for off-color jokes or double entendre and rejected advertisements thought unsuitable. Ross disliked fatalistic pieces and sought to minimize "social-conscious stuff," calling such articles "grim."

During the Second World War, the New Yorker ran on a skeleton staff after many contributors joined the war effort. Ross and his assistant William Shawn would put in six to seven days a week. To cultivate relationships, they published some PR works from the United States Department of War. "Survival", John Hersey's profile of future president John F. Kennedy, was also submitted to the department before receiving clearance. Kennedy's father Joseph P. Kennedy Sr. was disappointed that the story had gone to the New Yorker, which he deemed too small and niche. An irritated Ross, who saw his magazine as an underdog competing against the larger powerhouses, relented into allowing a reprint of the story in the Reader's Digest. Hundreds of thousands of copies would be distributed during the younger Kennedy's eventual campaigns for the U.S. House of Representatives and later the presidency.

Ross worked long hours and ruined all three of his marriages as a result. He was a careful and conscientious editor who strove to keep his copy clear and concise. One famous query to his writers was "Who he?" Ross believed the only two people everyone in the English-speaking world was familiar with were Harry Houdini and Sherlock Holmes. He was notorious for overusing commas. 

Quite aware of his limited education, Ross treated Fowler's Modern English Usage as his bible. He edited every issue of the magazine from the first until his death—a total of 1,399 issues. Ross designated Shawn as his preferred successor, which Fleischmann confirmed after Ross died.

James Thurber quotes the reminiscences of many colleagues of both men in his 1959 memoir, The Years with Ross, citing his former chief's pranks, temper, profanity, anti-intellectualism, drive, perfectionism, and an almost permanent social discomfort, and how these all shaped The New Yorker staff. Ross and his magazine slowly became famous among literati and newspapermen. Thurber quoted John Duncan Miller, the Washington, D.C., correspondent for The Times of London, after meeting Ross in 1938:During the first half hour, I felt that Ross was the last man in the world who could edit the New Yorker. I left there realizing that nobody else in the world could. He kept up a voluminous correspondence, which is preserved at the New York Public Library.

Death
Ross died in Boston, Massachusetts in December 1951, during an operation to remove a lung after it was discovered his bronchial carcinoma had metastasized. He died of heart failure during the operation.

Bibliography
.
.
Top Hat and Tales: Harold Ross and the Making of the New Yorker (movie) (Carousel Film and Video, 2001, 47 minutes)

References
.
.

Notes

External links

Ross biography and career analysis
Algonquin Round Table Walking Tours
Algonquin Round Table page at the Algonquin Hotel's web site
Algonquin Circle Links 

1892 births
1951 deaths
United States Army personnel of World War I
United States Army Corps of Engineers personnel
Military personnel from Colorado
American people of Scotch-Irish descent
American male journalists
American magazine editors
The_New_Yorker_editors
American magazine publishers (people)
Peabody Award winners
American magazine founders
People from Aspen, Colorado
Algonquin Round Table